Gregory Michael Cipes (born January 4, 1980) is an American actor. He is best known for his roles as Beast Boy in Teen Titans, Teen Titans Go! and Young Justice: Outsiders, Chiro in Super Robot Monkey Team Hyperforce Go!, Kevin Levin in Ben 10,  Michelangelo in Teenage Mutant Ninja Turtles (2012), and Splaat from RoboSplaat!. He has made appearances in the television series Gilmore Girls, in the season four episode "Ted Koppel's Big Night Out", and Deadwood. Cipes has also guest starred in an episode of Ghost Whisperer in the episode "Love Still Won't Die". He appeared as a freegan in the Bones season six episode "The Body and the Bounty". He also played a man who camps out in Roseanne's yard in her series Roseanne's Nuts. From 2009 to 2018, he appeared in a recurring role as Chuck, Mike Heck's freewheeling co-worker, in the ABC television series The Middle. His film career includes playing the character Dwight Mueller in Fast & Furious, Reed in National Lampoon's Pledge This!, Sam in Vile and many more.

Early life
Cipes was born in Coral Springs, Florida, on January 4, 1980. Growing up, he was an avid surfer who won several competitions, eventually ranking to #3 in junior surfing.

Career
Cipes voices Beast Boy in the animated television series Teen Titans and Kevin Levin in Ben 10. He also voices Stinkfly in the Ben 10 reboot media franchise. He reprised the role of Beast Boy in the spin-off series Teen Titans Go!, as well as the video games Teen Titans, the video game adaption of the series, and the online game DC Universe Online. He voiced Atlas in the Astro Boy anime series in 2003, as well as Chiro in the Super Robot Monkey Team Hyperforce Go!  in 2004. He is also referred to in the comic Teen Titans Go #26 as a stunt double named Craig Snipes. In 2012, he began working on Nickelodeon's Teenage Mutant Ninja Turtles voicing Michelangelo. He also voiced Tu in The Legend of Korra.

Four of his roles have love interests who are voiced by Ashley Johnson (Terra in Teen Titans, Jinmay in Super Robot Monkey Team Hyperforce Go!, Gwen Tennyson in Ben 10 and Renet in Teenage Mutant Ninja Turtles).

Cipes has made numerous appearances in television, in both commercials and television programs. He was one of seven friends in the MTV reality show Twentyfourseven. Cipes made some guest appearances on One on One as Butter, one of Arnaz Ballard's band members. He guest starred on House M.D. in the episode Family as a cane salesman. He has made appearances in the television series Gilmore Girls, in the season four episode "Ted Koppel's Big Night Out", and Deadwood. Cipes has also guest starred in an episode of Ghost Whisperer in the episode "Love Still Won't Die". He appeared as a freegan in the Bones season six episode "The Body and the Bounty". He also played a man who camps out in Roseanne's yard in her series Roseanne's Nuts. From 2009 to 2018, he appeared in a recurring role as Chuck, Mike Heck's freewheeling co-worker, in the ABC television series, The Middle.

Cipes is the front man for the reggae/hip-hop band Cipes and the People. The band has developed a following in Southern California, and other parts of the United States and Asia. Their first album, Conscious Revolution, was released by High Valley Entertainment on September 18, 2007. The song "Rescue" on the band's 2007 debut release Conscious Revolution features teenage pop star Jesse McCartney. Cipes also works as a singer in clubs in Los Angeles. He has released music videos for the songs "Fade Away", "Free Me", and "Oh Why Oh Why (Greg Cipes and Jah Sun)".

Cipes was the announcer for Cartoon Network from July to October 2008. In April 2017, he and Kevin Coulston created a new animated political parody impov series on Kickstarter, called A Fowl American. The story takes place on Planet Earth, where humanity has been wiped out. Animals rule the land, but President Rump, a parody of the 45th United States President, Donald Trump, is determined to repeat history.

Personal life
Beginning when he was eight, Cipes has eaten a vegetarian diet. In 2009, he became vegan. He was raised a Messianic Jew and identified as a "Christian Jew" in 2019, though previously he identified as irreligious in 2017, saying he was "free of mental slavery and hypocrisy" and joking to be a "believer in dog".
Cipes is a survivor of skin cancer.

Filmography

Voice-over roles

Animation

Film

Video games

Live-action roles

Film

Television

See also
List of vegans

References

External links
 
 

1980 births
Living people
American male film actors
American male television actors
American male video game actors
American male voice actors
American surfers
Male actors from Florida
Messianic Jews